The Gemini Award for Best Performance in a Comedy Program or Series (Individual or Ensemble) is a defunct award category, presented by the Academy of Canadian Cinema and Television from 1992 to 2000 as part of its Gemini Awards program.

When the Gemini Awards were first introduced in 1986, awards were presented for Best Actor in a Comedy Series and Best Actress in a Comedy Series. However, as Canadian television comedy was dominated in that era primarily by sketch comedy, comedy-drama or stand-up performance shows, rather than traditional sitcoms, comedy performance categories were discontinued after the 2nd Gemini Awards in 1987; for the next few years, performances in comedy-drama shows were eligible to be nominated in the drama performance categories, while sketch comedy performers could be nominated for Best Performance in a Variety or Performing Arts Program or Series.

Beginning with the 6th Gemini Awards in 1992, the Academy introduced a single award for Best Performance in a Comedy Program or Series, whose winners or nominees could be either an individual or an ensemble; however, the award was almost always won by an ensemble, with the cast of the sketch comedy series This Hour Has 22 Minutes winning it five of the ten times it was presented. Separate awards for individual performance and  ensemble performance were then introduced for the 16th Gemini Awards in 2001.

After 2010, with the reemergence of scripted comedy series in Canadian television, separate categories for Best Actor in a Comedy Series and Best Actress in a Comedy Series were reintroduced, alongside new categories for Best Supporting Actor in a Comedy Series and Best Supporting Actress in a Comedy Series, as of the 26th Gemini Awards in 2011. Since 2012, all four of the separate categories have continued to be presented as part of the contemporary Canadian Screen Awards.

Winners and nominees

References

Performance in a Comedy